A Lively Mind is the second studio album from the English electronic music producer Paul Oakenfold, released under the name Oakenfold. The album is the follow-up to Oakenfold's 2002 debut Bunkka. The single "Faster Kill Pussycat" features Brittany Murphy and is one of many collaborations to appear on the album, with other collaborators including Pharrell Williams, Grandmaster Flash and Ryan Tedder of OneRepublic.

Reception
Initial critical response to A Lively Mind ranged from mixed. At Metacritic, which assigns a normalized rating out of 100 to reviews from mainstream critics, the album has received an average score of 40, based on 9 reviews. The album was nominated for the Grammy Award for Best Dance/Electronica Album in 2007.

Track listing
"Faster Kill Pussycat" (featuring Brittany Murphy) – 3:14
"No Compromise" (featuring Spitfire) – 3:45
"Sex 'N' Money" (featuring Pharrell Williams) – 5:58
"Switch On" (featuring Ryan Tedder of OneRepublic) – 4:05
"Amsterdam" – 5:40
"Set It Off" (featuring Grandmaster Flash) – 4:17
"The Way I Feel" (featuring Ryan Tedder of OneRepublic) – 5:25
"Praise The Lord" – 4:13
"Save the Last Trance for Me" – 7:49
"Not Over" (featuring Ryan Tedder of OneRepublic) – 8:50
"Vulnerable" (featuring Bad Apples) – 5:55
"Feed Your Mind" (featuring Spitfire) – 2:56

"Not Over" is a remix/remake of the 1995 song "Not Over Yet" by Grace, Oakenfeld's former band, featuring new vocals and lyrics.

Charts

Weekly charts

Year-end charts

Certifications and sales

A Lively Mix

In October 2006, Oakenfold released the album A Lively Mix, containing remixes of eight of the songs from A Lively Mind.

Track listing 

 Faster Kill Pussycat [Club Mix]
 Save the Last Trance for Me [Club Mix]
 Sex 'N' Money [Club Mix]
 Vulnerable [Club Mix]
 Not Over [Album Mix]
 Amsterdam [Club Mix]
 No Compromise [Roman Hunter Mix]
 Feed Your Mind [Roman Hunter Mix]

References

External links
Official Paul Oakenfold Website

2006 albums
2006 remix albums
Albums produced by Ryan Tedder
Paul Oakenfold albums
Paul Oakenfold remix albums